Ratiporn Wong (born 21 June 1972) is a Thai swimmer. She competed in two events at the 1992 Summer Olympics.

References

1972 births
Living people
Ratiporn Wong
Ratiporn Wong
Swimmers at the 1992 Summer Olympics
Place of birth missing (living people)